Fayette Regina Pinkney (January 10, 1948 – June 27, 2009) was an American singer and one of the original members of musical group The Three Degrees.

Early life and career
Born in Philadelphia, Pennsylvania, Pinkney was one of three young teenagers brought together by manager Richard Barrett to form The Three Degrees in 1963. She was a part of the group until she was sacked by the manager Richard Barrett from the group in 1976, and was with them through their great years—with Roulette and Philadelphia International Records—and sang on many of their greatest hits, such as "When Will I See You Again" and "Take Good Care of Yourself". She traveled to London in January 1979 to record her only solo album, One Degree, which she did in just two weeks, to great acclaim from both her peers and fans.

Fayette subsequently earned a Bachelor's degree in psychology from Temple University and a Master's degree in human services from Lincoln University in 1984. She later worked as a counselor and vocal coach and, in addition to singing with her church's inspirational choir, she traveled with a group called the Intermezzo Choir Ministry.

Personal life and death
In 1994, Pinkney gave birth to a daughter, Ayana Alexandria, who died two days later due to sudden infant death syndrome. On June 27, 2009, Pinkney died of acute respiratory failure after a short and sudden illness at the age of 61.

Discography
One Degree (Chopper Records, 1979)

References

External links

The Three Degrees

20th-century African-American women singers
American rhythm and blues singers
American soul musicians
Deaths from respiratory failure
Lincoln University (Pennsylvania) alumni
Musicians from Philadelphia
Temple University alumni
1948 births
2009 deaths
Singers from Pennsylvania
20th-century American singers
20th-century American women singers
Burials at Ivy Hill Cemetery (Philadelphia)
21st-century African-American people
21st-century African-American women